Michael F. Lythcott (born April 6, 1974) is an American entrepreneur and investor who has founded several media and internet companies. He is the son of Barbara Ann Teer who founded Harlem's National Black Theatre in 1968, and the grandson of former Assistant Surgeon General George I. Lythcott.

Early life and  education
He received his BA from University of Pennsylvania and MBA from Columbia University.

Career
Lythcott has founded several companies including PureAdvice, TrueCredit (a division of TrueLink), Uplift Equity Partners, OnWax Media, and STAR Industries, LLC, among others.  After Truelink was sold to TransUnion in 2002, Lythcott Co-founded Uplift Equity Partners.

In 2004, while at Uplift, Lythcott formed Lythcott & Co, an incubator and holding company for his investments. In 2005, while a partner at Uplift Equity, he became the interim Chairman and CEO of VAS Entertainment, a position he held until he was replaced by media scion Andrew Tow. As CEO of VAS, Lythcott executive produced several feature films documentaries, and television shows, including the documentary Bra Boys starring Russell Crowe and Koby Abberton, the reality television show The Block for G4, and The Art of Flight starring professional snowboarder Travis Rice.
While at VAS he acquired 11 media companies, including Studio 411, which he bought from Casey Wasserman's WMG.

In 2010, Lythcott and Co partnered with the George Washington School of Business to established a proprietary customized MBA Program (STAR MBA). This program is specifically for professional athletes and entertainers to offer support for their future success as entrepreneurs and business owners. In 2013, Lythcott launched and incubated a second MBA program with University of Miami School of Business and Alex Rodriguez. He retired from active involvement in these Financial literacy and EMBA educational programs in 2017.

Philanthropy

Lythcott currently serves as the Chairman of the Board for the National BlackTheatre and Vice Chairman of Uptown Grand Central, a 501c3 nonprofit organization dedicated to transforming East 125th Street into a thriving corridor by delivering programs that put advocacy into action through collaborations with businesses, residents and neighborhood organizations across East Harlem.

References 

1974 births
Living people
Columbia Business School alumni
Place of birth missing (living people)
University of Pennsylvania alumni
American chief executives